Rubus frondosus is a North American species of highbush blackberry in section Arguti of the genus Rubus, a member of the rose family. It has been found in Ontario and in the eastern and central United States from Maine south to Georgia and west as far as Oklahoma, Nebraska, and Minnesota.

References

External links
 Photo of herbarium specimen at Missouri Botanical Garden, collected in 1878
 

frondosus
Plants described in 1824
Flora of Ontario
Flora of the United States
Flora without expected TNC conservation status